Acromantis montana, common name mountain acromantis, is a species of praying mantis found in India, Java, and Borneo.

See also
List of mantis genera and species

References

Montana
Mantodea of Asia
Mantodea of Southeast Asia
Insects of Borneo
Insects of India
Insects of Indonesia
Fauna of Java
Insects described in 1915